Attila Szász (born October 23, 1972, in Szolnok, Hungary) is a director and writer, known for Demimonde, The Ambassador to Bern and Eternal Winter.

Education and early career 
Szász graduated from the University of Theatre and Film Arts in Budapest in 1996. He has worked as a film critic, a film editor and founded a distribution company. In 2002, he became editor-in-chief of Hungarian movie magazine Vox but quit the same year to become a director.

Accolades 
He has won Best Director awards at film festivals in Fort Lauderdale, Montreal and Newport Beach among others.

References

External links
Official website

Hungarian film directors
1972 births
Hungarian caricaturists
People from Szolnok
Hungarian screenwriters
Hungarian male writers
Living people